Johnny Mansour (Arabic: جوني منصور; born December 25, 1960, Haifa) is a Palestinian academic, author and historian at the Department of History Studies at the Academic College in Beit Berl. He specializes in the contemporary history of the Middle East and Palestine, the Palestinian issue, and the history of Haifa city.

Career
Johnny Mansour was born in Haifa, 1960. He studied Islam and Middle East history in Haifa University. He completed his PhD at the University of Saint Petersburg (Saint Petersburg) in 1998 on the Medieval Muslim and Christian manuscripts in the 10th century. His research is focused on four main fields:  Islam and Middle East history, Arab Christians in Palestine and the Middle East, Arab-Israel conflict and the Palestinian cities, with an emphasis on the city of Haifa.

He is a lecturer in History of the Middle East, and published several books and researches in his upon fields. During the two coming years he will be working on the refugees issue in the Middle East: A comparative research between the Palestinian refugees in 1948 and the Syrian refugees during the Syrian crisis, with a focus on the solidarity of the local societies in different places when the issue of refugees arises.

Published research, articles

Books
 Mansour, J. (2018). Aqeeli Agha (The Biography of Aqeeli Agha El-Hassi).
 Mansour, J. (2018). Religiousness in The Israeli Educational Curriculum.
 Mansour, J. (2017). The Balfour Declaration Centennial (1917–2017).
 Mansour, J. (2016). The Land Day.
 Mansour, J. (2015). co-author of the photography book 'Contra el Olvido: Memoria Fotográfica de Palestina antes de la Nakba, 1889-1948' with Sandra Barrilaro, Teresa Aranguren, Bichara Khader and prologue by Pedro Martínez Montávez. Bilingual book in Arabic and Spanish from Ediciones del Oriente y del Mediterráneo
 Mansour, J. (2015). Haifa: A Word that has Become a City (Pictorial History).
 Mansour, J. (2014). Israel and the Settlement Project: Constant and Changing Policies of Governments, Parties and Public Opinion (1967–2013).
 Mansour, J. (2012). Arab Christians in Israel: Facts, Figures and Trends. (in English)
 Mansour, J. (2010). Lexicon of Israeli and Zionist Personalities and Terms.
 Mansour, J. (2009). The Social-Economic Changes of the Palestinian Cities During the British Mandate.
 Mansour, J. (2007). Jews and Arabs in Haifa During the British Mandate in Palestine (1920–1948), with Daphna Sharfman and Eli Nachmias. (English).
 Mansour, J. (2007). Al-Miftah (the Key Lexicon). Beir Zeit Uni.
 Mansour, J. (2007). Haifa Arab Tours.
 Mansour, J. (2005). The Israeli Settlements.
 Mansour, J (ed.) (2005). We Are More Strong than any Storm. (Articles dedicated for Elias Chacour).
 Mansour, J. (2004). Between Two States.
 Mansour, J. (2008). The Hijaz Railway: The History & Development of Daraa – Haifa Railway.
 Mansour, J & Mansour H. (2007). Reineh: History, Memory & Reality.
 Mansour, J. (1989). Haifa Arab Streets. New edition 1999.
 Mansour, J. (1998). Arab Government and Society in The Middle Ages.
 Mansour, J. (1998). Feasts and Seasons in the Arab Culture.
 Mansour, J. (1993). The Historical Guide of the Twentieth Century Events & the Jewish Modern History.
 Mansour, J & Bahou I. (1991). The Modern History of the Middle East.
 Mansour, J & Bahou I. (1990). Names & Terms in The Arab and Middle East History.
 Mansour, J. (ed.) (1990). Fifty Years for the Hajjar Bishop Memory.
 Mansour, J & Faour Y. (1989). Arab History in the Middle Ages.
 Mansour, J & Faour Y. (1989). The Ancient Civilization.
 Mansour, J. (1989). The Canaanites.
 Mansour, J. (1985). A New Vision of the Life and Deeds of Bishop Gregorios Hajjar. New edition 2013.

Articles
Selective articles in English & Other Languages:
 “Die Arabische Kultural Seinigendes Element in den Ortskirchen” in Harald Suermann(ed.), ZwischenHalbmond Und Davidstern- Christliche Theologie in Palastina heute. Herder, Freiburg, 2001. pp. 175–190.
 "International Political Changes & their Influence on Christian Arabs in the Middle East", in Al-Liqa Journal, Vol.24, Aug. 2005, pp. 91-105. (Jerusalem).
 "The Hijaz – Palestine Railway and the Development of Haifa", in Jerusalem Quarterly (28), 2006, pp. 5-21.
 "Le Chemin de Fer Du Hedjaz au debut 20 siecle, in Revue d'etudesPalestiniennes, 2006 (99). Pp.76-87. (Paris).
 "L'emergence du Movement SportifPalestinien sous le Mandat", in Kenneth Brown(ed.). Haifa EtatsD'Esprit States of Mind. Albiana, Paris 2010.
 Historicizing Climate: Haifawis and Haifo’im Remembering the Winter of 1950” with Dan Rabinowitz in Mahmoud Yazbak&Yfaat Weiss(eds.). Haifa Before & After 1948, Narratives Of A Mixed City. Institute for Historical Justice and Reconciliation(The Hague), Dordrecht, The Netherlands, 2011.
 "Acre and Haifa: Sisters on Two Sides of a Single Bay, in Jadal (Mada al-Carmel Research Institute Journal), Issue 18, Oct. 2013.
 "The Arabic Language in a Struggle", in Academia. edu. (2015).
 “Secrets of Espionage Hidden in Family Papers: Charles Boutagy and the Nili Network During World War 1”, in Jerusalem Quarterly, Issue. 66, 2016.

Papers Presented
 "Haifa in Biographies from The Mandate Time", in Haifa in Arabic, Haifa in Hebrew conference in Haifa University organized by The Van Leer Jerusalem Institute, in May, 2015.
 "Abdallah Mukhlis: His Life and Role in Exposing Arab and Islamic Heritage in Palestine", in  Arab Heritage conference held in Al – Qasimi Academic College, March 2015.
 Political Voices from Palestine in The First Arab National Conference in Paris 1913(The 100 years anniversary 2013).
 Water  Mills in Galilee and their Role in Social Changes in the Late Nineteenth Century. Agriculture in Bilad al- Sham from the Byzantine time to the end of The Ottoman Empire Conference, Jordan University, 2013.
 The Strategic Situation in the Middle East Till 2015. (2007), Amman, Middle East Studies Center.
 The Security System of Israel after the Second Lebanese War. (2007), Amman, The New Jordanian Studies Center.
 The Teaching System of Minorities During Conflicts. (2006), Maccedonia & Kosovo Step by Step Center.
 Palestinian Churches after 1948(1998), Catholic Church in Hampelstadt(London).
 Media & Human Dignity in the Holy Land(1995), Mexico: World Association for Christian Communication(WACC).
 Media & Education in Israel During the Peace Process(1995), Mexico: WACC.
 The Christian Local Press & Media(1993), Cyprus: The Middle East Council of Churches.

References

External links
 Johnny Mansour | Al-Zaytouna Centre for Studies and Consultations in Beirut
 Johnny Mansour | Beit berl

1960 births
People from Haifa
20th-century Palestinian historians
Israeli Arab historians
Living people
Saint Petersburg State University alumni
Academic staff of Beit Berl College
Historians of the Middle East
21st-century Palestinian historians